Nitokra is a genus of copepods belonging to the family Ameiridae.

The genus has cosmopolitan distribution.

Species:
 Nitocra arctolongus Shen & Tai, 1973 
 Nitocra balli

References

Harpacticoida
Copepod genera